The idea of player positions in paintball refers to the general mindsets and roles of play assumed by players of the sport.  There are various levels of complexity used by players when referring to such positions, and there is no official or universal set of player positions.

Tournaments 
Speedball teams typically consist of three to seven players in various positions:

Fronts (or "Frontman") – players assigned to the bunkers furthest up the field off the break. The position can also include the Snake player who is  assigned to the "snake" bunker specifically. A front man typically doesn't shoot off the break, simply running and diving for the furthermost downfield position. The 'snake' typically is the most influential element on the NXL/X-Ball tournament field. Speed and agility are two traits that work exceptionally well for a front player. Frontmen typically shoot the most players and use the least amount of paint since they have the most advantageous angles. There are typically not more than one or two front players on a team.

Mid-players – players assigned to the bunkers between the front and back players. They can also be "Insert", players, assigned the role of filling in the spot of key teammates that are eliminated. Mid-Players are also known as the 2. The mid is considered one of the most difficult positions to play in tournament paintball because he has to be a jack of all trades. A mid can fire while moving, he can slide into the snake, and he can make lanes. There are typically no more than 2 mid-players on a team.

Floater – The floaters are the roamers. Floaters are very quick and able roam around in the paintball field providing support to his teammates. They are also the ones who will take over in case one of them is hit. Thus, you must be experienced in playing various positions.

Back players (or simply "backs") – players usually assigned to the row of bunkers closest to the starting point (such as the home bunker). The Back players fires 'lanes' that suppress and take opposing players off the break while the mid and front players move. Back players sometimes carry as much as a 2,000 balls in their pod packs so they can consistently suppress opposing players. There are typically no more than 2 back-players on a team.

Insert players (or "inserts")- these are the type of players who can fill in anywhere needed. They can start out as a back player, and as a snake player is eliminated, can rush forward to where the eliminated player was and take control from there.

Scenario-specific roles and classes 
In Scenario paintball games, players are often assigned positions which they will then need to fulfill as part of the given scenario. These roles can be seen as different from team positions in that they are generally temporary roles only held by a player for the duration, and purpose, of a single game or event. Examples of some of the rules that a game producer might have:

 Engineer: Engineers have the ability to 'destroy' buildings, tanks, and special scenario targets. Typically this is done by using a faux satchel charge which the player throws and a supervising ref pulls the 'killed' players.
 General: Most common of all scenario games; there is typically at least one General for each side of a scenario. The general commands the scenario teams on his side and dictates orders to anyone on his side. In games where rank is accounted for, a General is typically worth more points.
 Officers: Besides the general, there are lower level officers like lieutenants and majors that are in the general's chain of command.
 Medic: The medic 'heals' players on the field instead of the 'injured' player having to take the long walk back to the insertion point.
 Sniper: A Sniper can point on an enemy player to the Ref, and the Ref will call that player out.
 Tank crewperson: Operates the tank, or fires from it. A tank gunner is typically armed with an ordinary marker firing out of ports of the tank's cannon.
 Tank hunter: Carries a nerf-rocket based 'Bazooka' that can destroy enemy tanks.
 Mercenary: Mercenary players, typically a field's scenario team, can be 'bought' at certain events by a general to use for a short-time. Mercenaries are typically experienced tournament players that know the field better than most of the field's players. Hell Survivor's Monster Game is famous for its mercenaries.

References

Paintball